Interstellar Guru and Zero is an album by Acid Mothers Temple & The Melting Paraiso U.F.O., released in 2009 by Homeopathic Records.

Track listing

Personnel

Credits, as stated on the liner notes:

 Tsuyama Atsushi - monster bass, tortoiseshell guitar, voice, cosmic joker
 Higashi Hiroshi - synthesizer, dancin'king
 Shimura Koji - drums, Latino cool
 Kawabata Makoto - electric guitar, acoustic guitar, sitar, voice, RDS900, synthesizer, organ, tape-loop, speed guru

Technical personnel

 Kawabata Makoto - Production and Engineering
 Niko Potočnjak - Artwork

References

External links
 Homeopathic Records

2009 albums
Acid Mothers Temple albums